The modern Medicine Wheel symbol was invented as a teaching tool in about 1972 by Charles Storm, aka Arthur C. Storm, writing under the name Hyemeyohsts Storm. It has since been used by various people to symbolize a variety of concepts, some based on Native American religions, others newly invented and of more New Age orientation. It is also a common symbol in some pan-Indian and twelve-step recovery groups.

Recent invention
Charles Storm, pen name Hyemeyohsts Storm, was the son of a German immigrant who claimed to be Cheyenne; he misappropriated and misrepresented Native American teachings and symbols from a variety of different cultures, such as some symbolism connected to the Plains Sun dance, to create the modern Medicine Wheel symbol around 1972.

Subsequently Vincent LaDuke (a New Age spiritual leader going by the name Sun Bear), who was of Ojibwe descent, started also using the Medicine Wheel symbol, combining the basic concept with pieces of disparate spiritual practices from various First Nations cultures, and adding elements of new age and occult spiritualism. LaDuke self-published a newsletter and several books, and formed a group of followers that he named the Bear Tribe, of which he appointed himself the medicine chief. For a fee, his mostly wealthy and white followers attended his workshops, joined his "tribe", and could buy titles and honors that are traditionally reserved for respected elders and knowledge keepers. For these activities LaDuke was denounced and picketed by the American Indian Movement.

Storm and LaDuke have been described as "plastic medicine men". They and others who have used this symbol to introduce their own ideas into what they claim are Native American and First Nations teachings have been accused by traditional Natives and activists of harming and displacing traditional teachings for financial motives. Others using the symbol for profit have added in ideas from Ancient Greek and Persian philosophy, ideas founded in colonialism, teachings from Hinduism, what they claim is Celtic symbolism, or concepts from New Religious Movements like Wicca.

Symbolism

While some of the symbols and teachings used with some versions of the Medicine Wheel may have grounding in some First Nations cultures, and these particular teachings may go back hundreds, if not thousands of years, critics assert that the pan-Indian context it is usually placed in can too easily displace the unique, traditional teachings of sovereign tribes, bands and Nations, and in some cases even replace traditional ways with new age, fraudulent ones.

New Age writers tend to center the idea of the medicine wheel as an individualistic tool of personal development, and use a stylized version with the circle divided into colored quadrants, with various personal qualities assigned to the colors and quadrants. This redefinition is in stark contrast to the Indigenous view of ceremony and sacred sites being rooted in the community rather than the individual.

In most versions, the four quadrants of the symbol are variously said to represent the four cardinal directions, four stages of life, four "races" of humanity, some selection of four "important virtues", or almost anything that can be divided by four. The symbol is constantly being reinterpreted for different purposes, however there are many common interpretations to the Medicine Wheel, as shown below:

Alice Kehoe writes that Native medicine wheel rites, along with other indigenous observance of the cyclical patterns in nature and life, are one of the reasons natives are supposed "more spiritual" than non-natives.

See also
Dreamcatcher
The red road
Pan-Indianism

References 

Native American culture
First Nations culture
Symbols
Cultural appropriation